Slađana Mirković (born 7 October 1995 in Sevojno) is a Serbian volleyball player. She plays as a setter with the Italian team Volley Bergamo and is a member of Serbian women's national team. In 2017 she moved to Chemik Police from Telekom Baku. 

She participated in the 2017 Women's European Volleyball Championship.

References

1995 births
Living people
Serbian women's volleyball players
Serbian expatriate sportspeople in Azerbaijan
Serbian expatriate sportspeople in Poland
Volleyball players at the 2015 European Games
European Games medalists in volleyball
European Games bronze medalists for Serbia
European champions for Serbia
Volleyball players at the 2020 Summer Olympics
Olympic volleyball players of Serbia
Medalists at the 2020 Summer Olympics
Olympic medalists in volleyball
Olympic bronze medalists for Serbia
21st-century Serbian women